Naked Among Wolves is a 2015 German drama film directed by Philipp Kadelbach. It is based on the 1958 novel of the same name by Bruno Apitz, which was published in 1958 by the East German Publishing house. It was created for television, it is the third film version of the literary text after the 1963 version.

Plot 
The film takes place in the years 1944 and 1945 towards the end of World War II in the Buchenwald concentration camp. Prisoners in the Nazi concentration camp risk their lives by taking in a young Jewish boy rescued from a ghetto in Poland. The camp commander hears about the boy and tightens up on the already cruelly treated prisoners. They whisk the boy away from being discovered, always staying one step ahead of the Nazi guards and the ireful commandant. The boy is eventually discovered and the prisoners who protected him now face certain death. They are freed by the Allies in a dramatic but altogether expected turn of events.

Cast 
 Florian Stetter - Hans Pippig
 Peter Schneider - André Höfel
 Sylvester Groth - Helmut Krämer
  - Hermann Reineboth
  - Robert Kluttig
 Rainer Bock - Alois Schwahl
  - Marian Kropinski
  - Hans Bochow

References

External links 
 

2015 television films
2015 films
2015 drama films
German drama television films
2010s German-language films
German-language television shows
Films based on German novels
Television shows based on German novels
German World War II films
Holocaust films
Films about communism
Films set in 1944
Films set in 1945
Films shot in the Czech Republic
German prison films
2010s German films
Das Erste original programming